Hapag-Lloyd Flug (between 2005 and 2007 also marketed as Hapagfly) was a German leisure airline headquartered in Langenhagen, Lower Saxony that was originally founded by Hapag-Lloyd and later became a subsidiary of TUI Group. It operated scheduled and charter passenger flights mainly to holiday resorts in Europe. Its successor is today's TUI fly Deutschland.

History

Foundation and early years
The original HAPAG company first became involved in the aviation industry in 1910, sponsoring Zeppelin flights.

Hapag-Lloyd Flug was established in July 1972, two years after HAPAG merged with Norddeutscher Lloyd, when the Hapag-Lloyd shipping group bought a few Boeing 727s to fly its cruise passengers from Germany to the ports of call for the cruises. It began operations on 30 March 1973. With the boom of the holiday charter flight market in the 1970s, it quickly adopted charter flights to popular holiday destinations in the Mediterranean Sea area and the Canary Islands as well and soon became one of the biggest German charter airlines. Throughout the years, the airline added regular passenger flights to its schedule, as well as new airplanes, such as the Boeing 737-100 and Airbus A310 aircraft. In 1979, Bavaria Germanair, a charter air carrier operating Airbus A300B4 and British Aircraft Corporation BAC One-Eleven series 400 and 500 jets, was merged into Hapag-Lloyd Flug.

In 1998, it became the first airline in the world to adopt the Boeing 737-800.

Mergers and rebrandings
Since 1997, it had been a subsidiary of TUI AG, which also includes the Hapag-Lloyd cargo container line and cruise line. When TUI released their new "big smile" logo in 2002, the Hapag-Lloyd livery that had remained unchanged for almost 30 years was completely changed to a new, light blue, white and red scheme with the new TUI logo on the tail to represent TUI's new corporate design. 2002 also saw the founding of Hapag-Lloyd Express, a low-cost airline that was to compete with the likes of Ryanair.

In November 2005, the airline changed its name to Hapagfly due to the new marketing strategy of the TUI Group. In January 2007 in a restructuring, it combined its operations with Hapag-Lloyd Express to become TUIfly, for which it operated all flights, while Hapag-Lloyd Express marketed them until TUIfly got its own license.

Destinations 
Hapag-Lloyd operated services mainly to European holiday resorts in the Mediterranean Sea area and on the Canary Islands. Most of them are now operated by TUIfly.

Fleet 
Over the course of its life, Hapag-Lloyd Flug operated all of the following aircraft, primarily through aircraft leasing from companies such as International Lease Finance Corporation (ILFC) and GECAS. It is also the first operator of the most popular Boeing 737-800 Next Generation series that first commenced operations in 1998.

Incidents and accidents 

 On 12 July 2000, Hapag-Lloyd Flight 3378, an Airbus A310 flying from Chania to Hanover, suffered fuel exhaustion caused in part by the crew's decision to continue the flight despite faulty landing gear that had partially retracted, which resulted in an emergency crash landing at Vienna Airport. The aircraft was written off, and 26 people were injured. Although it was the first (and remained the only) incident in Hapag-Lloyd's history in which an aircraft was damaged and people were injured, it caused much criticism in the media. In 2004, a Hanover district court convicted Captain Wolfgang Arminger of "dangerous interference into air traffic," saying he was "endangering others' lives" mainly by failing to divert to Zagreb, and sentenced him with a six-month suspended prison sentence.

References

External links 

 Hapagfly (Archive)
 Hapagfly (Archive)
 Hapag-Lloyd Flug (Archive)
 Hapag-Lloyd Flug (2001 Archive)
Hapagfly Fleet

Defunct airlines of Germany
Airlines established in 1972
Airlines disestablished in 2007
1972 establishments in West Germany
German companies disestablished in 2007
German companies established in 1972

de:Hapag-Lloyd